C55 or C-55 may refer to:

 , an Admirable-class minesweeper of the Mexican Navy
 Beechcraft C55 Baron, an American civil utility aircraft
 C55-isoprenyl pyrophosphate
 Caldwell 55, a planetary nebula
 Curtiss C-55 Commando, an American transport aircraft
 JNR Class C55, a Japanese steam locomotive
 Ogle County Airport in Mount Morris, Illinois
 Shipowners' Liability (Sick and Injured Seamen) Convention, 1936 of the International Labour Organization
 Xingu corydoras, a tropical freshwater fish
 C55, a Wordtank Japanese electronic dictionary